Ryushin Paul Haller, a Soto Zen roshi, is a former abbot of the San Francisco Zen Center—a position he held from 2003 until February 2012. Leaving his homeland of Belfast in Northern Ireland in the early 1970s, Haller spent time in Russia, Afghanistan and Japan. He then went to Thailand for two years where he was ordained as a Buddhist monk. Coming to California in 1974, he entered Tassajara Zen Mountain Center and was later ordained as a priest by Zentatsu Richard Baker in 1980. He received shiho from Sojun Mel Weitsman in 1993, giving him authority to teach.
Since 2000 Haller has also been the teacher of Black Mountain Zen Centre in Belfast, Northern Ireland.

See also
Buddhism in the United States
San Francisco Zen Center
Green Gulch Farm
Tassajara Zen Mountain Center
Timeline of Zen Buddhism in the United States

Notes

References

External links
Black Mountain Zen Centre
San Francisco Zen Center
Audio downloads of Talks by Paul Haller

1947 births
Living people
San Francisco Zen Center
Zen Buddhist abbots
Religious leaders from Belfast
Alumni of Queen's University Belfast
British Zen Buddhists
Buddhists from Northern Ireland
Religious leaders from the San Francisco Bay Area
Rōshi